TheMarker is a Hebrew-language daily business newspaper published by the Haaretz group in Israel.

TheMarker was founded in 1999 by journalist and entrepreneur Guy Rolnik along with Haaretz group and U.S.-based investors. Five years after TheMarker launched, Haaretz newspaper group decided to terminate its long-standing business section and relaunch it as a daily print newspapers called “TheMarker”, the brand that was created online.

The chief editor of TheMarker is Sami Peretz. The editor of the monthly magazine is Eytan Avriel. TheMarker alone has about 250 employees. It operates from Haaretz newspaper building in Tel Aviv.

In 2006 and 2007 TheMarker and Rolnik won the 2 most important awards in marketing and business strategy for creating TheMarker, turning it into the leading brand in financial media and using an internet brand to launch a print newspaper (see “Awards”).

Currently TheMarker produces a website, a daily print newspaper, a monthly print magazine and holds events on business-related issues. Some of TheMarker’s articles are translated to English and appear in the English version of Haaretz in cooperation with the International New York Times.

History
TheMarker, founded by Rolnik and Haaretz group, was incorporated in 1999 and launched in March 2000. Joined by his two friends and co-founders – Avriel and Ido Pollak – Rolnik launched what would become the first business news website and the first online newsroom in Israel. 

In December 1999, the American business news site TheStreet, entered into an agreement with Haaretz, to invest $2.25 million in
exchange for a 25% stake in TheMarker. According to the investment agreement, TheStreet.com published selected news and articles on Israeli technology companies from the TheMarker site, and in exchange TheMarker published selected news and articles from TheStreet.com. Following the bursting of the Dot-com bubble the investment in TheMarker was fully impaired by TheStreet.

In 2001 TheMarker started publishing a monthly print magazine, TheMarker Magazine. The magazine publishes yearly lists of “Israel’s 100 most influential people” and “Israel’s 500 richest people”, which draw considerable attention. In 2003 started organizing business-related events under its own brand.

In 2005 Haaretz daily newspaper's economic section was terminated and Haaretz launched “TheMarker” as a daily newspaper.

Following the relaunch, the number of Haaretz's paid subscribers increased significantly: by the end of 2006, the number of paid subscribers rose to all-time high of over 60,000 and ad revenues from TheMarker’s print edition grew by 50% compared to the pre-rebranding Period.

In 2008 the print edition of TheMarker became available as a stand-alone product as well.

In 2007 TheMarker launched “TheMarker Café”, Israel’s first social network for grown-ups and the first launched by a news organization.

Editorial views and opinions
In late 2011, TheMarker published a series of articles on three Nordic states – Finland, Sweden and Denmark – and their brand of economic order, mostly known as The Nordic Model, which is based on a combination of pro-market capitalism, welfare state policies and inclusive collective bargaining. The articles portrayed the countries that are characterized by competition along with a deep regard of humanistic values, whose citizens seem happy with the way things are and enjoy a high standard of living. The series was among the most-read in TheMarker’s history. 

TheMarker argued that the stability clause unconstitutional as it prevented future governments from governing by creating laws. TheMarker also argued that the price was not competitive, pointing to the falling global prices of natural gas.

Awards and recognition
Four of the awards were related to the January 2005 launch of TheMarker as a daily paid for newspaper:

Guy Rolnik won the Israel's Marketing Association's “Marketing person of the month” for July 2005. The judges wrote: “Rolnik is the person behind TheMarker’s latest move – the launch of the daily newspaper under TheMarker’s brand – a move that is a unique success. The launch of the new newspaper brought a dramatic change in the newspaper’s position in the economic arena, a renewal in subscriber additions in Haaretz, a decrease in churning and a strengthening of the loyalty of the readers to the newspaper”. Later that year he also won the association's “Marketing person of the year” award.

In 2006 TheMarker won the Israeli EFFIE Award in the media category for that year.
 In 2007 TheMarker won the EFFIE Platinum award for “Building the strongest economic brand in Israel”, which is awarded to multi-year marketing efforts and is considered the “Oscar” of marketing awards.

Some of the personal awards Rolnik won for his journalistic achievements include:
 June 2005: The Movement for Quality Government in Israel’s “Knight of Quality Government” award. The Movement said that it was awarded Rolnik “in gratitude for a unique contribution in the media for uncovering faults and in the public service, for a struggle against corruption and for the improvement of the quality of public sector. In his commentary, Rolnik raises the level of public criticism on the government's behavior and underscores its importance to the improvement of the quality of government. By doing so he sets an example of quality to his colleagues in the media and to Israeli society”.

The Sokolov Prize for “Lifetime Achievement” (The Israeli Pulitzer). In its decision to grant the prize to Rolnik, the jury wrote: “Guy Rolnik untiringly shed light on problems in the structure of the Israeli economy, the judges commented in granting him the award. Notably, Rolnik demonstrated the concentration of capital in the hands of a small number of financial organizations connected to the holders of political and governing power. He exposed grave flaws in the current structure and demanded they be corrected to ensure the existence of a more resilient, just and egalitarian economic system”.

Press mentions
In May 2004, HaAyin HaShevi'it interviewed journalists, business people and media experts in Israel who cited Rolnik as an influential columnist: “Rolnik writes the most important economic column in Israel, he has no competition. As a member of boards and committees I hear very often people talking about what Rolnik wrote this morning. People read his daily column avidly and with fear. There is no other journalist in Israel that has such position in his field – he is the master of the domain… When he mentions a person or a phenomenon in his column – its value will go up”. A senior executive in the media industry was quoted: “Rolnik is the most influential economics journalist in Israel, I read every word he writes. Unlike other journalists he manages to surprise me time and again because his position is so unpredictable”.

In February 2011, The New Yorker'''s editor, David Remnick, published a story about Haaretz and Schocken, saying "Under the leadership of a young, hyper-ambitious editor named Guy Rolnik, TheMarker brought a new, more youthful audience to Haaretz — one at least as interested in the high-tech industry as it is in the Palestinian issue — just as the worldwide newspaper crisis hit. TheMarker, which can be bought separately, has helped save the paper. Rolnik has been especially good at publishing investigative pieces on what he calls the 'Israeli oligarchs,' a small group of billionaires and their families who control much of the national economy".

In March 2015, journalist and media critic Michael Massing highlighted the work of TheMarker and Rolnik in an essay “How to fix American Journalism” that appeared in the special issue of The Nation magazine for its 150th anniversary. According to Massing, the unique campaign that waged Rolnik as editor-in-chief of TheMarker is the model for fixing American journalism: "TheMarker, an Israeli financial newspaper distributed as a supplement to Haaretz, waged an unflagging campaign beginning in the mid-2000s against the extraordinary concentration of economic power in Israel and the dangers that this development posed to Israeli society and democracy. Led by its founding editor, Guy Rolnik, the paper ran periodic stories and columns that paid special attention to the “Israeli oligarchs,” a small group of billionaires and their families who controlled much of the Israeli economy. When the campaign began, the subject of economic concentration was barely discussed in Israel. The stories fed growing outrage over inequality, leading to a series of mass demonstrations in 2011. Those protests, in turn, spurred the Knesset to pass a bill to break up the Israeli conglomerates. It was a remarkable display of how one news organization, through tenacious and unflinching reporting over a period of years, can help spur systemic change ... Remarkably, of the many high-profile digital-journalism sites—the Huffington Post, The Daily Beast, BuzzFeed, Business Insider—not one scrutinizes America's oligarchs the way TheMarker'' did Israel's. ProPublica, the prime investigative site on the web, has done impressive reporting on a number of important subjects, including fracking and the secret Fed tapes, but in general it remains wedded to a traditional narrow-focus approach".

See also
 List of newspapers in Israel

References

External links
 

Daily newspapers published in Israel
Hebrew-language newspapers
Haaretz Group
Israeli brands